Qaziabad (also Romanized as Qāẕīābād and Qāzīābād; also known as Qāẕī) is a village in Silakhor Rural District, Silakhor District, Dorud County, Lorestan Province, Iran. At the 2006 census, its population was 37, in 9 families.

References 

Towns and villages in Dorud County